Thisai Maariya Paravaigal is a 1979 Indian Tamil-language romantic drama film, directed by S. Jagadeesan. The film was produced by P. S. Veerappa and P. S. V. Hariharan under his productions P. S. V. Pictures. The film stars Sarath Babu and Sumalatha, in her debut film appearance. It was released on 19 October 1979.

Plot 

A harijan girl is brought up by a high-cast Brahmin in the agraharam, and the family is faced with antagonism and hatred. The girl's marriage to a Brahmin boy is thwarted, and out of frustration, she joins a nunnery.

Cast 

 Sarath Babu
 Sumalatha
 Major Sundararajan
 V. S. Raghavan
 M. N. Rajam
 T. V. Kumudhini
G. Srinivasan
 Veera Raghavan
 P. S. Veerappa
Usilai Mani
 Thyagaraj
 Desikan
 P. P. Subbaiah
 Leela
 Rooba Mohan
 MLA Thangaraj

Production 
Thisai Maariya Paravaigal is Sumalatha's feature film debut. It was shot in Gobichettipalayam.

Soundtrack 
Soundtrack was composed by M. S. Viswanathan and lyrics were written Ramalingaswamigal, Kannadasan and Pulamaipithan. The song "Raja Vaada Singa Kutti" is based on Kuntalavarali raga.

Reception 
Kausikan of Kalki praised Jagadeesan's story and direction, the performances of cast, Balakrishnan's cinematography and Viswanathan's music. He added that despite second half following typical formula, it was well directed and concluded even if the birds fly in different directions, they come to the hearts of the fans and gather together.

Accolades 
1979–1980 Tamil Nadu State Film Award

 Won – Best Film (Second Prize) – S. Jagadeesan
 Won – Tamil Nadu State Film Award for Best Story Writer – S. Jagadeesan
 Won – Tamil Nadu State Film Award for Best Male Playback – T. M. Soundararajan
 Won – Devar's New Face Award – Sumalatha

References

External links 
 

1970s Tamil-language films
1979 films
1979 romantic drama films
Films scored by M. S. Viswanathan
Indian romantic drama films